Drama therapy is the use of theatre techniques to facilitate personal growth and promote mental health. Drama therapy is used in a wide variety of settings, including hospitals, schools, mental health centers, prisons, and businesses.  Drama therapy, as a modality of the creative arts therapies, exists in many forms and can apply to individuals, couples, families, and various groups.

History 
The modern use of dramatic process and theatre as a therapeutic intervention began with Jacob L. Moreno's development of psychodrama, an action-based form of psychoanalysis. However, although Moreno's psychodrama preceded the beginning and development of drama therapy by roughly half a century, the field of drama therapy established itself as a distinct modality within the creative arts therapies and cannot be seen as merely an evolved form of psychodrama. The field of drama therapy has expanded to allow many forms of theatrical interventions as therapy including role-play, theatre games, group-dynamic games, mime, puppetry, and other improvisational techniques. Often, drama therapy is utilized to help a client:
 Solve a problem
 Achieve a catharsis
 Delve into truths about one's own self
 Understand the meaning of personally resonant images
 Explore and transcend unhealthy personal patterns of behavior and interpersonal interaction

The theoretical foundation of drama therapy lies in drama, theater, psychology, psychotherapy, anthropology, play, as well as interactive and creative processes.
In his book, "Drama as Therapy: Theory, practice and research," Phil Jones describes the emergence of the intentional use of drama as therapy as three-fold. First a long history of drama as a healing force with ancient roots in the healing rituals and dramas of various societies. The connection between drama and the psychological healing of society, though not of the individual, was first formally acknowledged by Aristotle, who was the originator of the term 'catharsis'. Secondly, in the early twentieth century, hospital theatre and the work of Moreno, Evreinov, and Iljine, marked a new attitude towards the relationship between therapy and theatre that provided a foundation for the emergence of drama therapy later in the century. Finally, influenced by experimental approaches to theatre, the advent and popularization of improvisational theater, group dynamics, role-playing and psychology in the 1960s, drama therapy emerged as a creative arts therapy in the 1970s.

Today, drama therapy is practiced around the world and there are presently academic training programs in Britain, Germany, the Netherlands, Canada, Croatia, Israel and the United States.

Core processes 

Phil Jones has written in his book Drama as Therapy, Theatre as Living that there are nine core processes at the heart of drama therapy.  These include projective identification and dramatic distancing.  Projective identification is the process whereby a person feels the feelings that the other is unable to access themselves.  Dramatic distancing refers to the way that emotional and psychological problems can be accessed easier through metaphor.  The client has a distanced relationship through metaphor to these problems that make them easier to tolerate.

Becoming a drama therapist 
In the US and Canada, the governing body is the North American Drama Therapy Association (NADTA), which establishes guidelines for the RDT (Registered Drama Therapist) credential and which provides accreditation for MA level programs and guidelines for alternative track training. In North America, Registered Drama Therapists hold a master's degree from one of five institutions accredited by the National Association for Drama Therapy: Antioch University at Seattle, Washington; Lesley University at Cambridge, Massachusetts; NYU Steinhardt at New York City, New York; California Institute of Integral Studies (CIIS) at San Francisco, California and Concordia University at Montreal, Quebec, Canada.  Persons who hold a master's degree in a related field can be registered as a Drama Therapist by pursuing what is known as Alternate Route Training, which consists of graduate coursework and internships performed under the supervision of a board-certified trainer.

In the UK, the statutory regulator of drama therapists is the HCPC and the professional body is the British Association of Dramatherapists (BADth). There are currently four post-graduate training courses in Dramatherapy in the UK that lead to a qualification approved by the Health Professions Council, accredited by the British Association of Dramatherapists, and recognized by the Department of Health. These courses are offered at Roehampton University, University of Derby, Central School of Speech and Drama, and Anglia Ruskin University.

In China, drama therapy is an emerging field. It was first introduced to China in 2013. There have been a few organizations working on the field recently, such as Apollo, Xinyishe  etc. 
The Hong Kong Association of Drama Therapists was established in 2009. Mr. Eddie Yu (President), Adeline Chan (Vice-president), Dorothy Wong and Kevin Ma are the founding members. Missions are to promote the professional development of drama therapists in Hong Kong.

Many of these universities suggest specific subjects to complete at degree level if you wish to pursue on to a masters programme in Drama Therapy. Some of these subjects are the following, Drama, Psychology or another such relevant profession.

In practice
The field of drama therapy can be somewhat varied in terms of techniques and procedures. However, there are some general commonalities. At the center of drama, therapy are the elements of role and story. Participants in drama therapy follow roles to tell a story or perform a part, thus embracing a new perspective of the character and themselves. Another key element is space, or where the acting takes place. Other components of drama therapy include ritual, conflict, resistance, spontaneity, distance and catharsis.

Drama therapy works to shed light on feelings and behaviors of a person and helps teach them ways to manage and overcome obstacles they struggle with. Clive Barker has called this a "journey through our own psychic landscape." The hope is that by taking on specific roles a person can gain personal insight and break free from barriers. Though this process can be very beneficial and rewarding, it can be very difficult. Progressions and developments can be slow going, and participants may be resistant to the process.

Though drama therapy can be done individually, it is typically done in groups or community settings. Groups can involve hundreds of people at a time, but more commonly range from six to ten people in institutional settings. As a form of counseling drama therapy is usually private and doesn't involve spectators. The exception to this rule is therapeutic theatre, which blends the techniques of applied drama to drama therapy. Therapeutic theatre entails the performance of a group of people to a selected audience, making it somewhat public.

See also

 Art therapy
 Applied improvisation
 Bibliotherapy
 Dance therapy
 Expressive therapies
 Forum theatre
 Music therapy
 Narrative therapy
 Nature therapy
 Playback Theatre
 Play therapy
 Psychodrama
 Psychology
 Role theory
 Theater games
 Theater of the Oppressed
 Theatre pedagogy
 Theraplay

References

External links
 World Alliance of Dramatherapy
 North American Drama Therapy Association (USA & Canada)
 British Association of Dramatherapists (UK)
 Società Professionale Italiana Drammaterapia (IT)
 The German Association of Dramatherapy (DE)
 Dramatherapy in Greece and Cyprus (GR)

 
Creative arts therapies
Theatre
Group psychotherapy